Dunlay is an unincorporated community in Medina County, Texas.  It lies about six miles west of Castroville and eight miles east of Hondo on U.S. Highway 90.

History
The town was named after Jerry Dunlay, a local train conductor. Dunlay, originally called Enterprise, was established in 1881 along the Galveston, Harrisburg and San Antonio Railway.  A post office was established in 1890 with Norval Seymour Murray as postmaster.  After May 10, 1895, the town was called Dunlay.

Dunlay is part of the San Antonio metropolitan area.

References

Unincorporated communities in Medina County, Texas
Unincorporated communities in Texas
Greater San Antonio
Populated places established in 1881
1881 establishments in Texas